Miles Davis: The Complete Columbia Album Collection is a box set by jazz musician Miles Davis, released in 2009. It contains all the official releases on the Columbia Records label. The box set consists of 70 CDs and 1 DVD.

Contents 
The box set contains fifty-two albums on seventy CDs spanning Davis' career on Columbia Records from 1949 to 1985. All albums feature their original tracklists, while some use various deluxe reissue tracklists when available. A few albums received never-before-released bonus tracks. It also includes a never-before-released CD of the full Isle of Wight 1970 concert, a bonus DVD of the Miles Davis Quintet performing live in Europe in 1967. It also contains a 250-page book with annotations on every album and a biographical essay by magazine editor Frederic Goaty. Since this covers everything that Columbia owns, several albums from the early stages and the later stage of Davis' career are not included. This includes everything released by Prestige Records from 1951 to 1960, which is 12 10" records, and 9 full albums. Also missing is the short-lived Warner Bros. contract Miles had from 1986 to 1991, ending with his death. This includes the praised Tutu and Amandla, as well as 3 others. (One Warner Bros. album, Rubberband, was not released until about 10 years after this set came out.)

The albums were ordered in the box set by time of recording (as opposed to album release date); this order is reflected in the list below. All albums were newly remastered in 2009 for supreme sound quality.

Bonus tracks and expansions 

 In Paris Festival International de Jazz, May 1949 is released for the first time on CD outside of Japan and includes two never-released bonus tracks, "The Squirrel" and "Lover Man".
 'Round About Midnight features the bonus tracks included on the 2001 reissue ("Little Melonae", "Budo", "Sweet Sue, Just You"), and also including the first alternate take of "Two Bass Hit", at around 7:00, not released anywhere else.
 Circle in the Round is unchanged.
 Miles Ahead features 4 previously released alternate takes: "Springsville", "Miles Ahead" (labelled at "Blues for Pablo"), "The Meaning of the Blues / Lament", and "I Don't Wanna Be Kissed (by Anyone but You)".
 Milestones features 3 previously released alternate takes: a second "Two Bass Hit", "Milestones" and "Straight, No Chaser".
 1958 Miles features 1 previously released alternate take: "Fran-Dance".  However, it does not include the 1958 show at The Plaza Hotel on the original release.
 At Newport 1958 is unchanged.
 Porgy and Bess featured 2 previously released alternate takes: "I Loves You, Porgy" and "Gone".
 Jazz at the Plaza is unchanged.
 Kind of Blue features 1 previously released alternate take: "Flamenco Sketches".
 Sketches of Spain features 2 previously released alternate takes: "Concierto de Aranjuez" (Part 1) and "Concierto de Aranjuez" (Part 2).
 Directions is unchanged.
 Someday My Prince Will Come features 1 previously released alternate take: "Someday My Prince Will Come".
 Friday Night and Saturday Night at the Blackhawk both contain the full Blackhawk shows, previously released.
 At Carnegie Hall contains the full Carnegie Hall, previously released.
 Quiet Nights features two unreleased tracks: "Blue Xmas (To Whom It May Concern)", and "Devil May Care".
 Seven Steps to Heaven features 1 previously released alternate take: "So Near, So Far" and 1 previously released outtake: "Summer Night".
 In Europe features 1 previously released track not on the original LP: "I Thought About You".
 My Funny Valentine is unchanged.
 'Four' and More separates the announcements and versions of "The Theme" with the rest of the tune it's attached to.
 Miles in Tokyo is unchanged.
 Miles in Berlin features 1 previously released track not on the original LP: "Stella by Starlight".
 E.S.P. is unchanged.
 At Plugged Nickel, Chicago features the original track listing of the LP but the unedited versions of the songs included, unlike any other reissue.
 Miles Smiles is unchanged.
 Sorcerer features 2 previously released alternate takes: "Masqualero" and "Limbo".
 Nefertiti features 4 previously released alternate takes: 2 of "Hand Jive", and 1 of "Madness" and "Pinocchio"
 Water Babies features 1 previously released outtake: "Splash".
 Miles in the Sky features 2 previously released alternate takes: "Black Comedy" and "Country Sun".
 Filles de Kilimanjaro features 1 previously released alternate take: "Tout De Suite".
 In a Silent Way is unchanged.
 Bitches Brew features 1 previously released outtake: "Feio".
 Big Fun features the more complete reissue version as opposed to the original LP version.
 Jack Johnson is unchanged.

Production
 Box Set Producer - Daniel Baumgarten and Richard Seidet
 Boxset Supervision/A&R - Steve Berkowitz
 Mastering Engineer - Mark Wilder and Maria at Battery Studio, NYC
 Mastering coordination - Donna Kloepfer
 Project Direction - Adam Farber and Zak Profera
 Archival Research - Michael Panico and Tom Tierney
 Tape Research - Matt Kelly
 Art Direction and Design - Bruno Lefèvre, Christophe Javault and Juliette Carrico / Objectif Lune [Paris]
 English translation - Michelle Sommers and Diane Cousineau
 Editorial Supervision [English translation] - Jeremy Holiday and Sheri Miller

References

External links
 Information page in www.kind-of-blue.de
 

Miles Davis compilation albums
2009 compilation albums
Albums recorded at CBS 30th Street Studio